Guram (Georgian: გურამ) is a Georgian masculine given name. Notable people with the name include:
Guram Adzhoyev (born 1961), Georgian-born Russian footballer
Guram Adzhoyev (born 1995), Hungarian-born footballer
Guram Batiashvili (born 1938), Georgian writer and playwright
Guram Kashia (born 1987), Georgian footballer 
Guram Kavtidze (born 1987), Georgian rugby player
Guram Kostava (born 1937), Georgian-Soviet fencer
Guram Dochanashvili (1939–2021), Georgian writer and historian
Guram Dolenjashvili (born 1943), Georgian painter 
Guram Gabiskiria (1947–1993), Georgian politician
Guram Gumba (born 1956), Abkhaz historian 
Guram Makayev (born 1970), Kazakhstani footballer
Guram Mamulia (1937–2003), Georgian historian, politician and Meskhetian rights campaigner
Guram Mchedlidze (1931–2009), Georgian paleobiologist and academician 
Guram Minashvili (1935–2015), Georgian-Soviet basketball player
Guram Nikolaishvili (born 1952), Georgian Army general
Guram Pherselidze (born 1985), Georgian wrestler
Guram Rcheulishvili (1934–1960), Georgian writer 
Guram Sagaradze (1929–2013), Georgian actor
Guram Sagaradze (born 1939), Georgian wrestler
Guram Sharadze (1940–2007), Georgian philologist, historian and politician
Guram Tetrashvili (born 1988), Georgian footballer
Guram Tskhovrebov (1938–1998), Georgian-Soviet footballer 
 
Georgian masculine given names